Myiothlypis is a genus of New World warblers, best represented in Central and South America. This is one of only two warbler genera that are well represented in the latter continent.  All of these species were formerly placed in the genus Basileuterus.

Species

 Citrine warbler, Myiothlypis luteoviridis
 Santa Marta warbler, Myiothlypis basilica
 White-striped warbler, Myiothlypis leucophrys
 Flavescent warbler, Myiothlypis flaveola
 White-rimmed warbler, Myiothlypis leucoblephara
 Black-crested warbler, Myiothlypis nigrocristata
 Pale-legged warbler, Myiothlypis signata
 Buff-rumped warbler, Myiothlypis fulvicauda
 Riverbank warbler, Myiothlypis rivularis
 Two-banded warbler, Myiothlypis bivittata
 Cuzco warbler, Myiothlypis chrysogaster
 Choco warbler, Myiothlypis chlorophrys
 White-lored warbler, Myiothlypis conspicillata
 Grey-throated warbler, Myiothlypis cinereicollis
 Grey-and-gold warbler, Myiothlypis fraseri
 Russet-crowned warbler, Myiothlypis coronata

References
 Curson, Quinn and Beadle,New World Warblers 
 Stiles and Skutch,  A guide to the birds of Costa Rica 

 
Parulidae
Bird genera
Higher-level bird taxa restricted to the Neotropics